Reshmi Soman is an Indian actress working in Malayalam television soap opera's. She made her debut in the Malayalam film, Magrib in year 1993. Later she established herself as the most bankable actress in Malayalam Television with back to back hit serials like Hari, Thaali, Akshayapathram, Saptani, Akkarapacha and Bharya.  Post marriage moved on to online media platform through her YouTube channel Ray's world of colors.

Personal life

Reshmi was married to A. M. Nazeer in 2001 & divorced in 2012.Later she married Gopinath Menon on 25 March 2015.

Television

Television serials (partial)

As Host
Super Dish (Surya TV) - 2012
Tharavismayam (Surya TV)
Treat (Media One) - 2015
My Super Chef (Asianet News) - 2019
Ray's World of Colours (YouTube) 2019–Present

Reality Shows as Judge
Veruthe Alla Bharya Season 3 (Mazhavil Manorama) - 2016
Dazzling Friends Hunt (Kairali TV) - 2012

Other roles
 Flowers Oru Kodi as Participant - 2022
 Madhuram Shobhanam as Dancer - 2021
 Bzinga as Participant - 2021
 Onnum Onnum Moonu as Guest - 2015, 2020
 Ivide Ingannanu Bhai as Guest - 2015
 Fast Track as Guest
 Santhosh Brahmi ad as Model

Filmography

Awards
 The Sheela Award – 2006

References

Living people
Indian actors
Actresses in Malayalam television
Actresses in Malayalam cinema
Indian women television presenters
Actresses from Thrissur
1980 births